Lochaber-Partie-Ouest is a township municipality in the Canadian province of Quebec, located within the Papineau Regional County Municipality. The township had a population of 926 in the 2021 Canadian Census.

The township is predominantly agricultural which is the main economic activity.

History
In 1807, a group of about 400 Scottish Highlanders settled in the area, the same year the geographic township of Lochaber Gore was created. They came from the Highlands, near Lochaber and other parts of northern Scotland. Settlement was difficult, because income from agriculture was lower than the costs of importing manufactured products from Montreal.

With the arrival of the logging industry, the settlers were able to practice agriculture during the summer, while working in the lumberjack camps during the winter, or to work in the various sawmills that developed along the Blanche River near Thurso. The logging industry also attracted many more settlers, including French Canadians, and settlement was well underway at the turn of the 19th to 20th century. The population became predominantly Francophone at the start of the 20th century.

In 1891, the township municipality of Lochaber-Partie-Ouest was created when it was split off from Lochaber Township.

Demographics 

Mother tongue:
 English as first language: 8.1%
 French as first language: 90.1%
 English and French as first language: 1.2%
 Other as first language: 1.2%

Local government
List of former mayors:

 Michel Labrecque (2001–2009)
 Jean-Pierre Girard (2013–2017)
 Pierre Renaud (2017–present)

References

External links

Township municipalities in Quebec
Incorporated places in Outaouais